Valt the Wonder Deer is a Chinese–American animated television series that was released to Tencent Video in China on December 31, 2016.

Series overview

Episodes

Season 1 (2016–17)

Season 2 (2018)

Season 3 (2021-2022)

Season 4 (2023)

Notes

References

Lists of American children's animated television series episodes